Charles Newman may refer to:

 Charles Newman (judge), British judge
 Charles Newman (author) (1938–2006), American novelist and critic
 Charles Newman (music producer) (born 1967), American music producer
 Charles Edward Newman (1900–1989), English physician and medical school dean
 Charles M. Newman (born 1946), mathematician
 Charles Thomas Newman (1841–1911), known as C. T. Newman, Australian Methodist minister
 Charles Newman (1924/5–2005), murdered by Andrew Lackey

See also
 Charlie Newman (1857–1922), Wales international rugby player
 Charlie Newman (baseball) (1868–1947), Major League Baseball outfielder
 Charlie Newman (Australian footballer) (1920–1991), Australian footballer for Collingwood and Melbourne